Filip Szymczak (born 6 May 2002) is a Polish professional footballer who plays as a forward for Ekstraklasa side Lech Poznań.

Career statistics

Club

Honours
Individual
Ekstraklasa Young Player of the Month: November 2022

References

External links

2002 births
Living people
Polish footballers
Association football forwards
Warta Poznań players
Lech Poznań II players
Lech Poznań players
GKS Katowice players
Ekstraklasa players
I liga players
II liga players
III liga players
Poland youth international footballers
Poland under-21 international footballers
Footballers from Poznań